Canadian Aeronautics and Space Journal (CASJ, French Journal aéronautique et spatial du Canada) is a triannual peer-reviewed scientific journal covering research on space and aerospace. It is the official journal of the Canadian Aerospace and Space Institute and is published by Scholastica in English. The journal was established in 1954 and the editor-in-chief is Philip Ferguson (University of Manitoba).

Abstracting and indexing
The journal is indexed and abstracted in the following databases:

See also
Canadian Journal of Remote Sensing

External links
 
 CASJ @ Canadian Aerospace and Space Institute

Publications established in 1954
Multilingual journals
Canadian Science Publishing academic journals
Triannual journals
Aerospace engineering journals